Chiapa may refer to:

 Chiapa, a Chilean town and the surrounding valley
 Chiapa de Corzo in Chiapas, Mexico, formerly known as Chiapa de los Indios
 San Cristóbal de las Casas in Chiapas, Mexico, formerly known as Chiapa de los Españoles
 Chiapa, an archaeological site in Chiapas, Mexico
 Chiapas, a Mexican state formerly known as Chiapa

See also
 Chiapanec
 Chiapanecas (disambiguation)
 Chiapanecan Volcanic Arc